Burnatia is a genus in the family Alismataceae. It includes only one currently recognized species, Burnatia enneandra. It is native to tropical and southern Africa from Senegal to Tanzania to South Africa. Among genera of the Alismataceae, it can be distinguished by not having a differentiated perianth (in Burnatia the petals are reduced), and being dioecious, with male and female flowers on separate individuals. Male flowers have 6 to 9 stamens and female flowers have many carpels and up to 2 staminodia.

References

External links
photo of herbarium specimen at Missouri Botanical Garden, collected in Nubia (Ethiopia) in 1837; isotype of Burnatia enneandra 
West African Plants, a photo guide Burnatia enneandra
Flora of Zimbabwe Burnatia enneandra
Plants in Lowland Savannah of West Africa, Burnatia enneandra 

Alismataceae
Alismataceae genera
Monotypic Alismatales genera
Flora of Africa
Dioecious plants